Sofia Rotaru, also known as Ballad of Violins is the second album by Soviet singer-songwriter Sofia Rotaru, released in 1974 by Melodiya. The album includes songs performed in Russian, Ukrainian, Bulgarian and Romanian languages.

Track listing

Side A
The songs recorded on the side A are all performed in foreign languages, with the musical background played by band Chervona Ruta, directed by Anatoliy Evdokimenko. Songs 1, 3, 4 are performed in Ukrainian language, 2 - in Bulgarian, and 5 - in Romanian languages.

Side B
The songs recorded on side B are all in Russian language. Ensemble Melodiya, under direction of Gueorguiy Garanyan provided the musical background.

References

See also 

1972 albums
1972 in the Soviet Union
Sofia Rotaru albums